InFocus Epic 1 is a smartphone marketed by InFocus and manufactured by Foxconn. It was released on 25 October 2016.

Specifications 
 Display: 5.50-inch Full HD Display
 Processor: MT6797M Deca Core (1.4 GHz)
 Rear Camera: 16 megapixels
 Front Camera: 8 megapixels
 RAM: 3GB
 OS: Android 6.0 Marshmallow
 Storage: 32GB (Expandable to 128GB)
 Battery capacity: 3000mAh

See also
InFocus M810

External links

References 

Mobile phones introduced in 2016